Seyl-e Habil (also Romanized as Seyl-e Hābīl, Sel Hābīl, and Seyl Hābī) is a village in Firuzabad Rural District, Firuzabad District, Selseleh County, Lorestan Province, Iran. At the 2006 census, its population was 462, in 102 families.

References 

Towns and villages in Selseleh County